Johnny Summers (21 January 1883 – 27 March 1946) was an English boxer who competed from 1901 to 1920. He was a British and British Empire (Commonwealth) welterweight champion.

Early life
Summers was born on 21 January 1883 in Middlesbrough, and raised in Canning Town.

Boxing career

Early career
Summers made his debut on 1 April 1901 at the Gaiety Athletic Hall, Sydney, Australia, forcing Bob Cooper to retire from the bout in the third round.

On 1 October 1906, Summers fought Boss Edwards for the NSC British featherweight title, winning the twenty round bout on points. He lost the title two months later to Spike Robson on 17 December, Summers being disqualified in the fourth round.

From May 1907 to April 1908, Summers boxed in the United States, beginning with a bout against Harlem Tommy Murphy on 22 May, at the National A.C. in Philadelphia, the bout ending in a draw. Summers ended his tour of the United States with a win over Steve Sullivan on 30  April 1908, at the Eureka A.C. in Baltimore.

On 8 November 1909, Summers fought Freddie Welsh for the NSC British and EBU European lightweight titles. This was also the first-ever contest for the Lonsdale Belt. Summers, bleeding as early as the third round, lost the twenty round bout on points.

British welterweight champion
On 11 April 1912, Summers fought Young Joseph for the BBBofC British welterweight title, at the Liverpool Stadium, Liverpool. Summers won the twenty round bout on points. He then faced Artur Evernden for the vacant NSC British welterweight title on 17 June 1912, winning the twenty round bout after forcing Evernden to retire in the thirteenth round. Summers defended the NSC title on 9 December 1912 against Sid Burns, winning the bout on points.

In a rematch against Burns on 11 June 1913, Summers again emerged victorious, retaining the BBBofC British welterweight title, and winning the British Empire (Commonwealth) welterweight title. Shortly after he travelled to Australia, where he defended both titles against Artur Evernden at Barker's Pavilion, Melbourne, on 11 June 1913, Summers winning the bout on points.

While still only twenty, New York Jewish boxer Harry Stone defeated Summers on 18 May 1913 in a non-title twenty round points decision at Olympic Stadium in Brisbane, Australia.  Though less experienced and six years younger, Stone was considered by most reporters to have outpointed Summers in nearly every round.  Years later, Stone wrote Summers "was a fighter with a world-wide reputation, and he had a wallop that would stop any clowning if he landed it, but his speed was not comparable to mine". In September, Stone defeated Summers again in a twenty round points decision in Sydney.

On 10 January 1914, Summers lost both titles to Tom McCormick by a points decision at the Sydney Stadium, Sydney. He got a rematch against McCormick on 14 February, but failed to win back the titles, being knocked out in the first round.

Later career
The NSC did not officially recognise the bouts in Australia, and so upon returning home, Summers contested the vacant NSC welterweight title against  Johnny Basham on 14 December. Summers, the more experienced fighter, was the favourite going into the bout, but suffered a knockout to the up and coming Basham. Summers would get one more title opportunity, against Bob Marriott for the NSC lightweight title on 23 June 1919. Summers was disqualified in the tenth round for holding.

Notable bouts

| style="text-align:centr;" colspan="7"|
|-  style="text-align:centr; background:#e3e3e3;"
|  style="border-style:none none solid solid; "|Result
|  style="border-style:none none solid solid; "|Opponent
|  style="border-style:none none solid solid; "|Type
|  style="border-style:none none solid solid; "|Rd., Time
|  style="border-style:none none solid solid; "|Date
|  style="border-style:none none solid solid; "|Location
|  style="border-style:none none solid solid; "|Notes
|- align=center
|Loss
|align=left| Bob Marriott
|
|
|
|align=left|
|align=left|.
|- align=center
|Loss
|align=left| Johnny Basham
|
|
|
|align=left|
|align=left|.
|- align=center
|Loss
|align=left| Tom McCormick
|
|
|
|align=left|
|align=left|.
|- align=center
|Win
|align=left| Artur Evernden 
|
|
|
|align=left|
|align=left|.
|- align=center
|Win
|align=left| Sid Burns
|
|
|
|align=left|
|align=left|.
|- align=center
|Win
|align=left| Sid Burns
|
|
|
|align=left|
|align=left|.
|- align=center
|Win
|align=left| Artur Evernden
|
|
|
|align=left|
|align=left|.
|- align=center
|Win
|align=left| Young Joseph
|
|
|
|align=left|
|align=left|.
|- align=center
|Loss
|align=left| Freddie Welsh
|
|
|
|align=left|
|align=left|.
|- align=center
|Win
|align=left| Jack Goldwain
|
|
|
|align=left|
|align=left|.
|- align=center
|Loss
|align=left| Spike Robinson
|
|
|
|align=left|
|align=left|.
|- align=center
|Win
|align=left| Boss Edwards
|
|
|
|align=left|
|align=left|.
|- align=center
|Win
|align=left| Seaman Arthur Hayes
|
|
|
|align=left|
|align=left|.
|- align=center
|Win
|align=left| Spike Robson
|
|
|
|align=left|
|align=left|.
|- align=center
|Win
|align=left| Bob Cooper
|
|
|
|align=left|
|align=left|.

See also
List of British welterweight boxing champions
List of British featherweight boxing champions

References

Bibliography

External links
 

|-

|-

|-

|-

1883 births
1946 deaths
English male boxers
Featherweight boxers
Lightweight boxers
Welterweight boxers
Sportspeople from Middlesbrough